Kal Khvajeh-ye Sofla (also Romanized as Kal Khvājeh-ye Soflá; also known as Kal Khvājeh) is a village in Dehdez Rural District, Dehdez District, Izeh County, Khuzestan Province, Iran. At the 2006 census, its population was 200, in 32 families.

References 

Populated places in Izeh County